During the 2022 Russian invasion of Ukraine there has been military and political collaborationism between Ukrainian citizens and officials and the Russian military.

Legal regulation 
After the Russian invasion of Ukraine on 24 February 2022, the Verkhovna Rada adopted two laws on collaborationism, which were later signed by Ukrainian President Volodymyr Zelenskyy:

Bill No. 5143 introduced an addition to the Criminal Code of Ukraine to Article 111-1 “Treason”. According to the amendment, liability was introduced for attempts to organize elections or organize power in the territories occupied by Russia.
Draft Law No. 5144 provides for amendments to the Criminal and Criminal Procedure Codes of Ukraine. According to the changes, the concept of “collaborationism” is introduced. Punishment is introduced for public denial of Russian armed aggression against Ukraine, support for the actions of Russia, propaganda, and the transfer of material resources.
The law on collaborationism has been discussed since the beginning of the Russian-Ukrainian war in 2014, but the Ukrainian authorities feared that too many residents of the occupied territories could fall under its action. To prosecute collaborators, articles on treason, financing of terrorism, obstruction of the lawful activities of the Armed Forces of Ukraine, etc. were used. The new law made it possible to impose punishment for the very fact of cooperation with the occupiers without the need to prove, for example, damage to the security of the state (as in the case of treason).

 Public denial of the fact of armed aggression against Ukraine, occupation of its territories, denial of the extension of state sovereignty to the occupied territories.
 Calls for support of the actions of the aggressor country, support and calls for cooperation with its armed formations or the occupying authorities.
 Voluntary occupation of positions in the occupation administrations and other illegal authorities, participation in elections or referendums in the occupied territories (up to 10 years in prison)
 Propaganda in the interests of the aggressor state in educational institutions, promoting the implementation of educational standards of the standards of the aggressor country (up to 3 years in prison)
 Transfer of material resources to the Russian military and other economic cooperation (up to 5 years in prison)
 Organization and conduct of political events in support of the occupation or participation in them (up to 20 years in prison)
 Voluntary occupation of positions in law enforcement or judicial bodies formed by the occupation authorities, participation in illegal armed or paramilitary formations or assistance to them in combat operations against Ukraine (up to 15 years in prison)
 Acts as an official in illegal government bodies that caused death of people or other serious consequences (up to life imprisonment).

Depending on the corpus delicti, Article 111-1 of the Criminal Code provides for penalties of varying severity. The minimum is the deprivation of the right to hold certain positions or engage in certain activities for people holding positions in illegal government bodies that are not related to the adoption of administrative or organizational decisions, as well as for those who spoke out in support of Russia in the media and the Internet. As an additional measure of punishment, confiscation of property may be applied.

The Ukrainian authorities noted that they were not going to persecute people who were forced to work in the occupied territories — public utilities employees, doctors, etc. At the same time, policemen and judges who continued to work after the occupation  unequivocally fall under the law.

Authorities 

Meduza journalists noted that the Russian authorities were probably acting on the basis of the notions of 2014, when the political confrontation in Ukraine allowed them to win over the elites in some regions, members of Viktor Yanukovych 's Party of Regions, and some grassroots movements. 

However, after the beginning of the invasion in February 2022, the opposite situation developed: society and political forces consolidated around the sovereignty of Ukraine. In the occupied territories, many politicians who previously spoke from pro-Russian positions refused to cooperate with the Russian military, and the occupation administrations were formed from among insignificant politicians, petty officials and random people.

In February-June 2022, the Chesno movement added 47 collaborating politicians to its list: 12 in the Donetsk region, 10 in Kharkiv region, 9 in Kherson region, 8 in Zaporizhia region, 3 each in Lugansk and Sumy regions, 2 in Mykolaiv region. By party affiliation, most of the collaborators were members of the pro-Russian Opposition Platform - For Life (19 out of 34 members of political parties)

Following the invasion, Russia began to organize military-civilian administrations in occupied territories, despite the fact that Russian President Vladimir Putin stated that Russia's plans do not include the occupation of Ukrainian territories.

Kherson 

Volodymyr Saldo, the mayor of Kherson in 2002-2012, and a supporter of repressions against the opposition in 2014, became the head of the occupation administration of the Kherson region. In the local elections in 2020, Saldo lost to Ihor Kolykhaiev, and his party received only 7% of the vote in the regional council and 11% in the regional one. After the occupation in March 2022, Saldo became one of the founders of the collaborationist "Committee of Salvation for Peace and Order", and a month later, the Russian military seized the city council of Kherson and appointed Saldo as the head of the occupation administration.

The city administration of Kherson was headed by Oleksandr Kobets, whom the Ukrainian media called the former driver of the legally elected mayor Kolykhaev. Other members of the Salvation Committee include Kirill Stremousov, a pro-Russian far-right blogger and anti-vaxxer, who won 1.3% of the vote in the 2020 Kherson mayoral elections. Other members of the committee were associated with the movement of the oligarch, Vladimir Putin's godfather Viktor Medvedchuk, the banned Communist Party of Ukraine and various pro-Russian organizations, had problems with the Ukrainian special services.

In Kakhovka, the Russian military seized the city council on April 1 and appointed Pavel Filipchuk, a former deputy of the Kherson regional council from the pro-Russian Opposition Platform - For Life!, as the head of the city occupation administration. (OPLE), who was part of the team of the chairman of the regional council Vladislav Manger, suspected of involvement in the murder of Kherson activist Kateryna Handziuk.  After a series of unsuccessful attempts to be elected mayor of Kakhovka, Filipchuk moved to Sochi and returned shortly after the invasion began. Oleg Bukhovets, an ex-deputy of the district council from the Party of Regions, was appointed head of the city's "police". The leadership of the community noted that the employees of the city executive committee refused to cooperate with Russian appointees.

On March 12, in Genichesk, the Russian military ousted the legally elected mayor and appointed Gennady Sivak from Kramsk as the head of the occupation administration. Andriy Klochko, a deputy of the district council from the Opposition Platform For Life party, a former activist of Viktor Medvedchuk's Ukrainian Choice organization, became the city's chairman. Andriy Klochko, a member of the Genichesk District Council from OPZZ, was appointed "acting mayor" in Henichesk. Of the 15 headmen of the Genichesk district, only 5 went to cooperate with the Russian military. Nova Kakhovka under Russian administration was headed by a small entrepreneur Vladimir Leontiev, and Skadovsk was headed by a Russian citizen Sergei Shvaiko, who previously worked as a builder.  

The Washington Post reported that the Ukrainian authorities after the capture of Kherson faced problems related to ambivalent attitude or even sympathy towards Russia among many residents: some of them fled the city when Russian troops retreated, reducing the human resource for rebuilding the city, while the other part stayed behind and, according to the Washington Post, it is unknown what should be done with them. Thus, according to the newspaper, some locals received Russian passports in order to receive benefits, while others received Russian wage supplements for agreeing to continue working. This situation has led to social tensions and conflicts

Mykolaiv 
In May, the head of the Mykolaiv District Prosecutor's Office was detained by the SBU for passing on to an unnamed Russian blogger, whose fan he was, data on captive Russian servicemen, military and civilian casualties, and passwords for moving around the region.

Zaporizhzhia 

According to Meduza's estimates, key posts in the occupation administrations in Zaporizhzhia Oblast have been occupied by people unknown even to local residents. So in March 2022 (under the current Ukrainian authorities), Vladimir Rogov, a radical pro-Russian activist and former ally of Oleg Tsarev, who ended up in Russia as part of a prisoner exchange in 2014, proclaimed himself Mayor of Melitopol. 

After the legally elected mayor Ivan Fedorov was kidnapped by the Russian military in Melitopol, his acting Galina Danilchenko was appointed - a deputy of the City Council from the pro-Russian "Party of Regions", and then the "Opposition Bloc". She also became the first civil servant who was formally charged with collaborationism. 

The Russian military then formed the government in the city under the leadership of former People's Deputy Yevgeny Balitsky, Melitopol city council members Oleksandr Falk and Halyna Danylchenko (who formally headed the city's "committee of people's elected officials"). In Energodar, a parallel government body, the "Public Council of Self-Organization of the City," was created under the leadership of city council member Andriy Shevchyk. In Berdyansk, a representative of the Union of Left Forces party, Oleksandr Saulenko, took on the "temporary duties of the mayor" and declared himself the "People's Mayor" of Berdyansk. A criminal case was initiated against Volodymyr Rykun, the head of Mykhailo community of Zaporizhzhya region, who stated that he went to the negotiations with the Russian military.

Kharkiv 
The mayor of Kupyansk, Kharkiv Oblast, Hennadiy Matsegora, went to the side of the Russian Federation. The head of Balakliia, Ivan Stolbovy, agreed to cooperate with the Russian authorities. On February 28, 2022, Oleksandr Bryukhanov, the mayor of Yuzhnosti, was detained in Kharkiv Oblast on suspicion of treason. Mayor of Izyum Valery Marchenko reported that two deputies of the city council and the ex-mayor had gone over to the side of the occupiers. According to one of the Izyum City Council officials, Anatoly Fomichevsky, a deputy from the OP-ZZh, helped the Russian military enter the city along an unprotected road.

Luhansk 
In Luhansk Oblast, the Russian military was supported by the mayor of Stanytsia Luhanska, Albert Zinchenko, the mayor of Rubizhne, Serhiy Khortiv, the head of the Markov community Igor Dzyuba, the head of the village of Melovoye Oleg Savchenko, and the head of the Svatovsky District Council Lyudmila Rusanova.

Donetsk 
In Mariupol, Donetsk region, which was partially controlled by the Russian military, 10 Mariupol city councillors, one Lyman city councillor, the deputy of the city council from the party "Opposition platform - For life" Kostyantyn Ivashchenko, along with nine representatives of the party, agreed to cooperate. The mayor of Sviatogorsk, Volodymyr Bandura, have also agreed to cooperate with the Russian military during this time. In Volnovakha, only in the first months of the occupation, the Russian military replaced 4 leaders of the city, as of May this position was occupied by a former security official, businessman and MP from the Opposition Platform for Life, Artur Antsiferov.

Scale 
The first case of collaborationism was sent to court on March 30, 2022, where a resident of Kramatorsk published a video in TikTok in which he denied the fact of the Russian invasion and called to support the actions of the aggressor country. By mid-October, Ukrainian law enforcement agencies had opened more than 2,000 cases, and courts had handed down 116 verdicts. Most of the cases reflected in the official register concerned denial of Russian aggression, another part concerned officials' cooperation with the occupiers, and only a few concerned active assistance to the Russian military (for example, transmitting information about AFU positions).

In the vast majority of cases, the defendants pleaded guilty and received minimal punishment - suspended sentences, a ban on holding elective positions and certain types of activities. Representatives of the legal community noted that such punishment for the lightest forms of collaborationism was apparently intended as a kind of lustration to exclude collaborators from politics and local government in the future.

On March 16, 2022, the movement "launched" the database of traitors of Ukraine "DerzhZradnyky". As of April 4, 2022, it contained 70 names. On March 19, 2022, the National Anti-Corruption Bureau of Ukraine reported that it had data on 245 people who may be helping Russia. As of 26 March 2022, the State Bureau of Investigation opened about 200 cases for collaborationism.

On 3 April 2022, the Prosecutor General of Ukraine Irina Venediktova announced that 99 people were in custody on suspicion of treason and 4 people on suspicion of collaborationism. On April 7, 2022, NSDC Secretary Oleksiy Danilov said that on behalf of President Zelensky, work was underway on a register of collaborators, which would soon be published. The first traitors were included in the register on April 12.

State authorities 
The invasion was supported by a People's Deputy from the already banned pro-Russian party Opposition Platform — For Life, Ilya Kiva, calling for "liberation of Ukraine from Western occupation." A number of MPs from the including anyone affiliated with businessman and Vladimir Putin's close friend, Viktor Medvedchuk, left Ukraine even before the invasion started: they are Oleg Voloshyn, Vadim Rabinovich, Nataliya Korolevska, Igor Surkis. Some, like Ilya Kiva, moved to Russia. Medvedchuk himself, who escaped House arrest, which was a restrictive measure for treason and attempted plunder of national resources in annexed Crimea, was arrested on April 12, 2022 while trying to leave Ukraine. On 6 March 2022, the Prosecutor General of Ukraine Iryna Venediktova announced her suspicions of Kiva. On 15 March 2022, 335 deputies voted for his expulsion. He is currently wanted for treason.

In July 2022, Zelensky dismissed the heads of two key agencies - the Prosecutor General Irina Venediktova and the head of the SBU Ivan Bakanov. The reason was the large number of collaborators in both agencies, including high-ranking security officials such as Kulinich or Andrei Naumov, the former head of the internal security chief who fled on the eve of the invasion and was soon detained in Serbia on money laundering charges. In the ensuing reshuffles, Zelensky replaced heads of the SBU in Zhytomyr, Kharkiv, Sumy, Poltava, Zakarpattia and Dnipropetrovsk regions.

Security agency 
The Washington Post noted that the FSB unit in Ukraine began expanding in 2019 and was actively recruiting supporters (both ideologues and those working for money) in security agencies. It was believed that the corruption and deep infiltration of Russian agents in the SBU would undermine Ukraine's ability to resist invasion. Some of them complied with the agreements: for example, SBU head for Crimea Oleg Kulinich handed over internal SBU files to Russia for two years and, on the night before the invasion, blocked the distribution of intelligence that an attack on the Kherson region from Crimea would begin in a few hours.

After February 24, however, many of the enlisted enforcers refused to carry out FSB missions. Moreover, when the invasion began, the Ukrainian security agencies began to work much more efficiently - among other things, the personal example of Volodymyr Zelensky, who remained in the capital, where the fighting was taking place, contributed to this. During the large-scale purges in February-August 2022, more than 800 officers of law enforcement agencies up to generals were detained in more than 650 cases of treason (the conspiracy uncovered in April was reported by the Secretary of the National Security and Defense Council, Oleksiy Danilov).

Civilian population 
According to the Mayor of Melitopol, Ivan Fedorov, some apartment building managers provide the Russian military with lists of empty apartments.

Immediately after the seizure of the village of Dymer in Kyiv Oblast, a local resident, Oleksandr Kharchenko, headed the collaboration administration. After the retreat of  Russian troops from Kyiv Oblast, Oleg Tsarev wrote the following: "I spent more than a month mainly in the settlements belonging to the district centers near Kyiv, Borodyanka and Ivankiv. Now the Russian army has left these settlements. I hope that all those who started to cooperate with us from the local residents have managed to leave Ukraine".

Church organization 
On 1 December 2022, Zelenskyy said that the government was preparing a draft law banning religious organizations linked to centres of influence in the Russian Federation from operating in Ukraine. In particular, this applies to the Ukrainian Orthodox Church of the Moscow Patriarchate, which is considered affiliated with the Russian Orthodox Church. Earlier the SBU reported that during a search in a monastery of the Moscow Patriarchate in Zakarpattia Region, it found a large amount of materials which were considered propaganda. According to The Kyiv Independent, the SBU searched several churches of the Ukrainian Orthodox Church over the past week. Zelenskyy's statement was made while addressing the 31st anniversary of Ukraine's vote for independence from the Soviet Union.

Assassination attempts and deaths of collaborators

Before February 2022 
On January 1, 2015, in Lutuhyne, the motorcade of Oleksandr Bednov, who served as the Minister of Defense of the "LPR" in August 2014 and was later named Chief of Staff of the 4th Motorized Rifle Brigade, was burned with flamethrowers.

On January 23, 2015, Yevhen Ishchenko, who was the "mayor" of the occupied city of Pervomaysk, was killed by unidentified persons during the shelling of his car on the Pervomaysk-Lysychansk highway. Three other volunteers from Russia were killed along with him.

On April 15, 2015, Oleg Kalashnikov, a former MP from the Party of Regions, died of a gunshot wound at the door of his apartment at 31 Pravdy Avenue between 19 and 19.20 pm. He was involved in the organization of Anti-Maidan and the beating of peaceful demonstrators during the Revolution of Dignity.

On December 12, 2015, Pavel Dremov, the "ataman" of the Don Cossacks unit, was blown up by explosives planted in the car while on his way to celebrate his wedding in a car stolen from a local businessman.

In September 2016, the occupation authorities arrested Gennadiy Tsypkalov, the head of the "LPR Council of Ministers," in Luhansk in a case of attempted coup d'état. A few days after his arrest, Tsypkalov was found hanging in the cell where he was being held. According to the official version of the LPR Prosecutor General's Office, Tsypkalov committed suicide, and that the reason for this could be that he "realized the depth of his criminal actions."

On February 4, 2017, Oleg Anashchenko, the head of the department of the so-called "People's Militia of the LPR", was killed in Luhansk as a result of a car bombing in the city center.

On January 19, 2018, Valentyn Doroshenko, an active participant in the so-called "Russian Spring" of 2014 in Odesa, the leader of the "Stalin Party", was killed by police officers in a shootout on Novoselsky Street. He was known throughout the city for challenging the then-mayor Eduard Hurvits to a duel in the summer of 2009.

On August 31, 2018, a bomb explosion in the Separ cafe in Donetsk killed the leader of the DPR terrorist organization Oleksandr Zakharchenko.

On October 24, 2020, Lieutenant Colonel Oleksiy Markov (call sign "Dobryi"), a commander of the Prizrak militant group, died in an accident in Luhansk.

After February 2022 

Collaborationist officials and law enforcement officers have become a priority target for guerrillas operating in contact with Ukrainian security services. The main purpose of such operations is not to kill, but to warn of the consequences of cooperation with the Russian military.

Several collaborating officials from Kherson were injured as a result of targeted attacks by the HIMARS MLRS : the head of the labor department was Injured when the building of the regional administration was hit on September 16, the former deputy of the Verkhovna Rada from the "Party of Regions" Oleksiy Zhuravko  - during the shelling of the hotel building, the first deputy head of the regional occupation administration for security - as a result of an accurate hit on his house.

References

2022 Russian invasion of Ukraine by country

Pro-Russian militant groups